Juxia (from ) is an extinct genus of paraceratheriid, a group of herbivorous mammals that are related to the modern rhinoceros. Juxia was around the size of a horse. It lived in Asia during the upper Eocene. 
 
As an early indricothere, Juxia had a relatively light body, held by elongated long legs and small skull firmly attached to a relatively long neck. Based on its triangular like teeth and sharp protruding incisors, Juxia was probably a strict browser, feeding on ferns and leaves on branches where most herbivorous mammals couldn't reach. In terms of habitat, Juxia lived in densely lush and tropical forests of what is now China. Though a few skeletons have been found, it is unclear whether this early indricothere was permanently solitary or lived in small social groups, possibly harems. Based on its morphology, Juxia's long legs probably enabled it to run relatively fast for a limited duration. This was probably a defense mechanism against early mammalian predators.

References

Eocene rhinoceroses
Eocene mammals of Asia
Hyracodonts
Fossil taxa described in 1964